"They All Laughed" is a song composed by George Gershwin, with lyrics by Ira Gershwin, written for the 1937 film Shall We Dance where it was introduced by Ginger Rogers as part of a song and dance routine with Fred Astaire.

Lyrics

The lyrics compare those who "laughed at me, wanting you" with those who laughed at some of history's famous scientific and industrial pioneers, asking, "Who's got the last laugh now?" People and advances mentioned are Christopher Columbus's proof the Earth is round; Thomas Edison's phonograph; Guglielmo Marconi's wireless telegraphy; the Wright brothers's first flight; the Rockefeller Center; Eli Whitney's cotton gin; Robert Fulton's North River Steamboat; Milton S. Hershey's Hershey bar chocolate; and Henry Ford's "Tin Lizzy" Model T car.

Recording and releases
Fred Astaire with Johnny Green and His Orchestra recorded the song on March 18, 1937. Brunswick Records released it as a single, which appeared on the U.S. record charts. Astaire recorded the song again in 1952 for his album The Astaire Story and again in 1975 for the album The Golden Age Of Fred Astaire.

References 

Songs with music by George Gershwin
Songs with lyrics by Ira Gershwin
1937 songs
List songs